Richard James Lundy (August 14, 1907 – April 7, 1990) was an American animator and film director who worked at several animation studios including The Walt Disney Company, MGM, and Hanna-Barbera. Lundy was a pioneer of personality animation and is best remembered as one of the creators of Donald Duck. Throughout his career he worked as a primary animator on at least 60 films, both short and feature-length, and directed 51 shorts.

Early life
Lundy was born in Sault Ste. Marie, Michigan, to James and Minnie Lundy, their only child. Shortly after his birth the family moved to Detroit, where Lundy's father worked as an inspector for the Burroughs Adding machine Company.

When Lundy was ten years old, his parents separated and he and his mother went to live in Port Huron north of Detroit. They later moved back to the city where Lundy's mother worked as a waitress. Lundy moved to Los Angeles in the late 1920s.

Career
In 1929, Lundy began to employed by Walt Disney Productions, He became the studio's dance specialist, animating many of the musical numbers in early Disney shorts. He later worked on Three Little Pigs (1933) and Orphan's Benefit (1934). After working on Snow White and the Seven Dwarfs (1937), Lundy became a director at Disney.

In 1943, Lundy departed the Disney studios and worked for Walter Lantz Productions. He started as an animator and again became a director. He directed shorts featuring Andy Panda, Woody Woodpecker, and the Swing Symphonies. Lundy was responsible for shifting the studios direction to a style more in vain to works made by Disney and MGM, a stark contrast when compared to the works of the studios previous director, James Culhane. Lundy worked for Wolff Productions after the Lantz studio closed in 1949. Here he worked on television commercials. In 1950, Lundy worked for MGM on Barney Bear shorts and the Droopy film Caballero Droopy.

In 1959 Lundy worked for Hanna-Barbera on The Flintstones, Yogi Bear, and Scooby-Doo. He retired in 1973, but continued to do freelance work for several years thereafter.

Donald Duck
Lundy was not the first to draw or even animate Donald Duck. The character was created by Swiss-born designer Albert Hurter and animated by Art Babbitt and Dick Huemer for the short film The Wise Little Hen (1934). This was Donald's first appearance, although the story offered little opportunity for character development. This would come in Donald's second appearance, Orphan's Benefit (also 1934), in which Lundy was the sole animator of Donald. According to common animation practice, the audio and voices of the film were recorded first and were then played for the animators to reference. In listening to voice actor Clarence Nash portray the Duck in Orphan's Benefit, Lundy said "[I] decided that [Donald] was an ego-show-off. If anything crossed him, he got mad and blew his top."

Personal life
Lundy was married three times. First marriage with Anne Lundy resulted in two biological children, after the divorce he moved to Toluca Lake California. In 1932 he married Juanita Sheridan who also worked at the Disney studio. This marriage was short and ended in divorce in 1934.

By 1939, Lundy was remarried to Mabel Lundy. Together they had one daughter Llewellyn, resulting in three biological Lundy children.

Filmography

Films

Disney (and other films) period 
In this period, most of the films in which Lundy worked belong to Disney
 Playful Pan (animator - uncredited) (1930)
  Pioneer Days (animator - uncredited) (1930)
 Winter  (animator - uncredited) (1930)
  The picnic  (animator - uncredited) (1930)
 The Gorilla Mystery (animator - uncredited) (1930)
 Monkey Melodies (animator - uncredited) (1930)
 The Chain Gang (animator - uncredited) (1930)
 Night  (animator - uncredited) (1930)
 The Shindig (animator - uncredited) (1930)
 Midnight in a Toy Shop  (animator - uncredited) (1930)
 The Ugly Duckling (animator - uncredited) (1931)
 Mickey's Orphans (animator - uncredited) (1931)
 Mickey Cuts Up  (animator - uncredited) (1931)
 The Beach Party   (animator - uncredited) (1931)
 Blue Rhythm  (animator - uncredited) (1931)
 The China Plate (animator - uncredited) (1931)
 The Moose Hunt  (animator) (1931)
 Mother Goose Melodies  (animator - uncredited) (1931)
  The Castaway  (animator) (1931)
 Traffic Troubles  (animator - uncredited) (1931)
  Birds of a Feather  (animator - uncredited) (1931)
 The Birthday Party   (animator - uncredited) (1931)
 Mickey's Good Deed  (animator - uncredited) (1932)
 The Duck Hunt    (animator - uncredited) (1932)
 Babes in the Woods  (animator - uncredited) (1932)
 The Whoopee Party  (animator - uncredited) (1932)
 Trader Mickey   (animator - uncredited) (1932)
 Flowers and Trees  (animator - uncredited) (1932)
 Just Dogs  (animator - uncredited) 1932
 Mickey in Arabia (animator - uncredited) (1932)
 Puppy Love    (animator - uncredited) (1933)
 Mickey's Mechanical Man  (animator - uncredited) (1933)
 Mickey's Gala Premier  (animator - uncredited) (1933)
  Three Little Pigs  (animator - uncredited) (1933)
 Father Noah's Ark (animator - uncredited) (1933)
 Building a Building  (animator - uncredited) (1933)
 The Dognapper  (animator - uncredited) (1934)
 Mickey Plays Papa   (animator - uncredited) (1934)
 Orphan's Benefit  (animator - uncredited) (1934)
 The Wise Little Hen (animator - uncredited)  (1934)
 Gulliver Mickey  (animator - uncredited) (1934)
 Funny Little Bunnies  (animator - uncredited) ( 1934)
 Playful Pluto  (animator) (1934)
  The Grasshopper and the Ants  (animator - uncredited) (1934)
 Shanghaied   (animator - uncredited) (1934)
 Music Land  (animator - uncredited) (1935)
 Pluto's Judgement Day (animator) (1935)
  Who Killed Cock Robin?  (animator: "Dan Cupid" - uncredited) (1935)
 Mickey's Kangaroo   (animator - uncredited) (1935)
 Mickey's Service Station  (animator - uncredited) (1935)
 The Tortoise and the Hare  (animator - uncredited) (1935)
 Toby Tortoise Returns  (animator - uncredited) (1936)
 Thru the Mirror  (animator - uncredited) (1936)
 Three Little Wolves  (animator - uncredited) (1936)
 Mickey's Grand Opera  (animator - uncredited) (1936)
 Orphans' Picnic    (animator - uncredited) (1936)
  Snow White and the Seven Dwarfs (animator) (1937)
 Woodland Café  (animator - uncredited) (1937)
 Mickey's Parrot  (animator - uncredited) (1938)
 Donald's Cousin Gus (animator - uncredited) (1939)
 Society Dog Show  (animator - uncredited) (1939)
 Sea Scouts (director) (1939)
 Donald's Lucky Day  (animator - uncredited) (1939)
 Mr. Mouse Takes a Trip  (animator - uncredited) (1940)
 The Riveter (director) (1940)
 Window Cleaners  (animator - uncredited) (1940)
 Pluto's Dream House   (animator - uncredited) (1940)
 Mr. Duck Steps Out  (animator - uncredited) (1940)
 Timber (animator - uncredited) (1941)
 A Good Time for a Dime (director) (1941)
 Donald's Camera (director) (1941)
 Ding Dog Daddy  (animator - uncredited) (1942)
 The Dover Boys at Pimento University or The Rivals of Roquefort Hall  (animator - uncredited) (1942)
 Donald's Gold Mine  (animator and director) (1942)
 Donald's Garden (director) (1942)
 The Village Smithy  (director-uncredited) (1942)
 The Flying Jalopy (director-uncredited) (1943)
 Donald's Tire Trouble (director) (1943)
 Home Defense  (animator) (1943)
 Commando Duck  (animator - uncredited) (1944)

Woody Woodpecker (and other films) period 
In this period, most of the films in which Lundy worked belong to Woody Woodpecker's film series
 Ski for Two  (animator - uncredited) (1944)
 The Beach Nut  (animator) (1944)
 Abou Ben Boogie   (animator - uncredited) (1944)
 Fish Fry   (animator - uncredited) (1944)
 Chew-Chew Baby   (animator - uncredited) (1945)
 The Enemy Bacteria (director) (1945)
 The Poet & Peasant (director) (1945
 Crow Crazy (director) (1945)
 Sliphorn King of Polaroo (director) (1945)
 The Pied Piper of Basin Street   (animator - uncredited) (1945)
 Reddy Made Magic (director) (1946)
 The Wacky Weed (director) (1946)
 Bathing Buddies (director) (1946)
 Apple Andy (director) (1946)
 Musical Moments from Chopin  (director) (1946)
  The Egg and I (director) (1947)
 Smoked Hams (director) (1947)
 The Story of Human Energy (director) (1947)
 The Bandmaster (director) (1947)
 Solid Ivory (director) (1947)
  Well Oiled (director) (1947)
 Woody the Giant Killer (director) (1947)
 The Overture to 'William Tell' (director) (1947)
 The Coo Coo Bird  (director) (1947)
 Wild and Woody! (director) (1948)
 Dog Tax Dodgers (director) (1948)
 Playful Pelican (director) (1948)
 Pixie Picnic (director) (1948)
 Wet Blanket Policy (director) (1948)
 Wacky-Bye Baby (director) (1948)
 Kiddie Koncert (director) (1948)
 Banquet Busters (director) (1948)
  The Mad Hatter (director) (1948)
 Drooler's Delight (director) (1949)
 Scrappy Birthday (director) (1949)
 Puny Express (director-uncredited) (1950)
 Sleep Happy (director-uncredited) (1951)

Metro-Goldwyn-Mayer period 
In this period, most of the films in which Lundy worked belong to Metro-Golwyn-Mayer
 Busybody Bear (director) (1952)
 The Little Wise Quacker (director) (1952)
 Caballero Droopy (director) (1952)
 Tom Schuler: Cobbler Statesman (director-uncredited) (1953)
 Half-Pint Palomino (director) (1953)
 Wee-Willie Wildcat (director) (1953)
 Heir Bear (director) (1953)
 Cobs and Robbers (director) (1953)
 Barney's Hungry Cousin (director) (1953)
 Bird-Brain Bird Dog (director) (1955)
 Sleepy-Time Squirrel (director) (1954)
  Billy Boy (director-uncredited) (1954)

Last years as animator
 The Impossible Possum (director) (1954)
 The Man Called Flintstone (animator - credited as Richard Lundy) (1966)
  Fritz the Cat (animator and second layout - credited as Richard Lundy) (1972)
  Charlotte's Web (key animator) (1973)
 Mickey Mouse Disco  (animator) (1980)

TV 
 The Woody Woodpecker Show  (director) (1957)
 The Huckleberry Hound Show (animator - 7 episodes) (1959-1960)
 Bear for Punishment/Batty Bat/Huck the Giant Killer (1959)  
Stranger Ranger/Mighty Mite/A Bully Dog (1959)  
 Papa Yogi/King Size Poodle/Somebody's Lion (1959)  
 Huck Hound's Tale/Party Peeper Jinks/Robot Plot (1960) 
 Spud Dud/High Jinks/Tricks and Treats (1960) (segment "High Jinks")
 Space Bear/Puss in Boats/Huck's Hack (1960)  
 Hoodwinked Bear/Goldfish Fever/Picadilly Dilly (1960)  
 The Quick Draw McGraw Show (animator - 14 episodes) (1959-1961)
 The Flintstones (animator - 60 episodes) (1960-1966)
 Child Sock-Cology (Short) (animator) (1961)
 Count Down Clown (Short) (animator) (1961)
 Snagglepuss (TV Series) (animator - 1 episode) (1961)
 Royal Rodent (1961)  
 Top Cat (animator - 2 episodes) (1961-1962)
All That Jazz (1961)  
 Dibble's Double (1962)  
 Beef for and After (Short) (animator) (1962)
 The Yogi Bear Show (animator - 6 episodes, 1961 - 1962)  
 Bear Foot Soldiers/Royal Rodent/Judo Ex-Expert (segment "Royal Rodent") (1961) 
 Ice Box Raider/One Two Many/Baddie Buddies  (segment "Baddie Buddies") (1961)
Disguise and Gals/Remember the Daze/Foxy Proxy  (segment "Foxy Proxy") (1961) 
 Genial Genie/The Gangsters All Here/Duck the Music (segment "Genial Genie") (1961) 
 Yogi's Birthday Party  (animator/animation supervisor) (1962) 
 The Jetsons (animator - 4 episodes) (1962-1963)
 The Venus (1962)  
Uniblab (1962)  
The Coming of Astro (1962)  
 The Little Man (1963) 
 Rancid Ransom (Short) (animator) (1962)
 The Hanna-Barbera New Cartoon Series (animator - 2 episodes) (1962)
 Gator-Napper/Water-Melon Felon/Zero Hero  
 Droopy Dragon/See-Saw/Whale of a Tale  
 Common Scents (Short) (animator) (1962)
 Raggedy Rug (Short) (animator) (1964)
 The Magilla Gorilla Show (animator - 9 episodes) (1964-1965)
 Fairy Godmother (1964)
 Masquerade Party (1964)
 Airlift (1964)
 Mad Avenue Madness (1965)
 Magilla Mix-Up (1965)
 Montana Magilla (1965)
 That Was the Geek That Was (1965)
 Love at First Fight (1965)
 Bird Brained (1965)
 The Secret Squirrel Show (animator - 1 episode) (1965)
 Sub Swiper/Way Out Squiddly/Prince of a Pup  
 The Atom Ant Show (animator - 2 episodes) (1966)
 Killer Diller Gorilla (uncredited)
 Bully for Atom Ant  
 Frankenstein Jr. and The Impossibles (animator) (1966)
 Moby Dick and the Mighty Mightor (animator) (1967)
 The New Adventures of Huckleberry Finn (animator - 5 episodes) (1968-1969)
 The Magic Shillelah (1968)
 Huck of La Mancha (1968)
 The Last Labor of Hercules (1968)
 The Eye of Doorgah (1968)   
 Mission of Captain Mordecai (1969)
 The Adventures of Gulliver  (animator - 1 episode) (1968)
 The Forbidden Pool (1968)  
 The Perils of Penelope Pitstop (animator - 6 episodes) (1969)
 The Treacherous Movie Lot Plot  
 Carnival Calamity  
 Wild West Peril  
 The Boardwalk Booby Trap  
 The Terrible Trolley Trap  
 Jungle Jeopardy  
  Josie and the Pussycats (animator - 1 episode) (1970)
 Plateau of the Apes Plot  
 Scooby Doo, Where Are You! (animator - 8 episodes) (1970)
 Don't Fool with a Phantom  
 Who's Afraid of the Big Bad Werewolf?  
 A Tiki Scare Is No Fair  
 Haunted House Hang-Up  
 Jeepers, It's the Creeper  
 Scooby's Night with a Frozen Fright  
 Mystery Mask Mix-Up  
 Nowhere to Hyde  
 Where's Huddles? (animator - 10 episodes) (1970)
 One Man's Family  
 A Sticky Affair  
The Odd Trio  
Get That Letter Back  
To Catch a Thief  
Hot Dog Hannah  
 The Offensives  
The Ramblin' Wreck  
 A Weighty Problem  
 The Old Swimming Hole  
 The New Scooby-Doo Movies (animator - 16 episodes) (1972)
 The Roman Holidays (animator - 3 episodes) (1972)
 Cyrano deHappius  
 Hectic Holiday  
Double Date  
 The ABC Saturday Superstar Movie (animator - 1 episode) (1972)
Yogi's Ark Lark  
 The Flintstone Comedy Hour (animator - 1972)
 Love, American Style (animator - 1 episode) (1972)
 Love and the Bachelor Party/Love and the Latin Lover/Love and the Old-Fashioned Father/Love and the Test of Manhood  (segment "Love and the Old-Fashioned Father")
 Yogi's Gang (animator - 2 episodes) (1973)
 Mr. Hothead  
Dr. Bigot  
 ABC Afterschool Specials (animator - 1 episode) (1974)
 Cyrano (1974)  
 Captain Caveman and the Teen Angels (animator - 8 episodes) (1977)
 Playing Footsie with Bigfoot  
The Strange Case of the Creature from Space  
 The Fur Freight Fright  
Cavey and the Weirdo Wolfman  
The Creepy Claw Caper  
Double Dribble Riddle  
The Creepy Case of the Creaky Charter Boat  
The Mixed Up Mystery of Deadman's Reef 
 Woody Woodpecker and His Friends (Video documentary) (original material) (1982)
 Walter, Woody and the World of Animation (Documentary short) (original material) (1982)
 The King of Ads (Documentary) (segment "Coca-Cola commercial") (1991)

Notes

External links
 

Animators from Michigan
American film producers
American film directors
American animated film directors
American animated film producers
Walt Disney Animation Studios people
1907 births
People from Sault Ste. Marie, Michigan
1990 deaths
Burroughs Corporation people
Metro-Goldwyn-Mayer cartoon studio people
Walter Lantz Productions people
Hanna-Barbera people